Dmitry Alekseyevich Pakhomov (born 18 July 1994) is a Russian football player. He plays for FC Kosmos Dolgoprudny.

Club career
He made his debut in the Russian Football National League for FC Olimp-Dolgoprudny on 6 March 2022 in a game against FC Spartak-2 Moscow.

References

External links
 
 
 
 Profile by Russian Football National League

1994 births
Footballers from Moscow
Living people
Russian footballers
Association football midfielders
FC Sportakademklub Moscow players
FC Olimp-Dolgoprudny players
Russian Second League players
Russian First League players